The Institution of Engineers (India) is the national organization of engineers in India. It has more than one million members in 15 engineering disciplines in 125 centers or chapters in India and overseas; it is the world's largest multi-disciplinary engineering professional society in the engineering and technology world. This institute was established in 1920 in Kolkata, West Bengal, and is acclaimed to have pioneered non-formal education in engineering. The institute conducts an examination of its associate membership. This examination is considered to be on par with B.E. / B.Tech. When contemplated as an eligibility qualification to write competitive examinations like the Indian Civil Service, Indian Engineering Services, GATE, etc., and for employment in Government, public and private sectors in India. This qualification is recognized by the Ministry of HRD, the government of India, as equivalent to B.E./ B.Tech. The institute was incorporated by Royal Charter in 1935. It is currently headquartered at 8 Gokhale Road, Kolkata.

Preface
The Associate Member of the Institution of Engineers India is a professional certification given by The Institution of Engineers (India). The qualification can be earned by passing Section A, Section B, Project Work, and Laboratory experiments examination of the Institution. If an applicant passes both sections of the examination, he or she becomes an Associate Member of The Institution of Engineers (India) (AMIE). The Indian Ministry of Human Resource Development considers this qualification equivalent to a degree in engineering. AMIE was earlier Grad IE (Bachelor's degree of Institution). The government of India in continuation to its earlier recognition has recognized the passing of sections A and B examinations as revised, conducted by The Institution of Engineers (India), as equivalent to a bachelor's degree in the appropriate branch of Engineering of the recognized universities in India and has notified in the Gazette of India, Part I, Section I, dated February 11, 2006. AMIE is also recognized by UK-NARIC as a British bachelor's honors degree. AMIE is also recognized by FCSA Foreign credential service of America as equivalent to a bachelor's degree in engineering. The minimum duration for passing both sections is 4 years, however, professionals with 3 years of polytechnic engineering can complete it in 3 years since they are exempted from certain examination papers of Section A. Project work and Laboratory experiments can be carried out only after clearing at least 5 subjects of Section B.

History
IEI was established in 1920 in Madras with Sir Thomas R. J. Ward as the founding president. It was formally inaugurated in 1921 by Lord Chelmsform, the then-Viceroy of British India. In 1935. IEI obtained the Royal Charter of Incorporation from King George V 'to promote and advance the science, practice, and business of engineering. Sir Thomas Guthrie Russell (President 1933–34) led the successful petition for a Royal Charter. Harold Williams served as President for a period in the 1950s. The Institution obtained the full membership of the Engineers Mobility Forum (EMF) at the Bi-annual International Engineers Meetings 2009 held in Kyoto, Japan on 17 June 2009.

Development
Subsequently led to the birth of the local institutions. Sdasysnkya of this institution in 1920 where it was only 138 thousand in 1926 exceeded there. The organization launched a quarterly magazine to remove 1921 and in June 1923, a quarterly bulletin (Vivrnptrika) was put out with him. Membership in this organization, it's Aesoshiatt 1928 (associate membership) had started to take the exams, every level of government engineering college b. S. C. The degree is considered equivalent. December 19, 1930, the then Viceroy Lord Irwin, the foundation of its own private building 8, Gokhale Road, in Calcutta. January 1, 1932, the company's office moved into the new building. September 9, 1935, in relation to a State Charter of the emperor George V accepted. In the second paragraph of the declaration of the institution, duties are described briefly as follows: "Indian engineers to meet the goals and objectives of the entity being established, they increase the general development of engineering and engineering science, their implementation in India and people associated with the organization and members of engineering-related topics Information And-in providing facilities to receive and give ideas." The branches of this institution slowly began spreading across the country. Timely Mysore, Hyderabad, London, Punjab and open its center in Bombay. May 1943 Associate Membership exams began to be taken twice a year. In 1944, four major categories of technical operations were established. Civil, Micanikl (mechanical), electrical (electrical), and General (General) Engineering. Different for each department head has to be elected for a term of three years. The Silver Jubilee was celebrated in 1945 in Calcutta. Bihar in 1947, Mdhyprant, Sindh, Balochistan and Tiruwankur, these four locations open new centers.

Fora
There are five fora of the IEI: the National Design & Research Foundation (NDRF), Water Management Forum (WMF), Safety and Quality Forum (SQF), Sustainable Development Forum (SDF), and Rural Development Forum (RDF). The IEI also has an autonomous organ, the Engineering Staff College of India.

Functions
In addition to representing India in the Engineers Mobility Forum, the institution has been prominent in World Mining Congress (WMC), the World Federation of Engineering Organizations (WFEO), the Commonwealth Engineers’ Council (CEC), the Fédération Internationale du Béton (fib), and the Federation of Engineering Institutions of South and Central Asia (FEISCA). It has no worldwide bilateral agreements with other professional societies.

Government Recognitions
Government notification: - Associate Member (A.M.I.E.) is a bachelor's degree in engineering awarded by The Institution of Engineers (India). For those who have pursued a formal education in Engineering, an associate membership engineering degree certificate can be achieved by qualifying in the examinations conducted by the institution. This entails passing Section A, Section B, and the Project Work, Laboratory Experiments examination of the Institution. The government of India, in continuation to its earlier recognition, has recognized the passing of Sections A & B Examinations as revised, conducted by The Institution of Engineers (India), as equivalent to a bachelor's degree in the appropriate branch of engineering of the recognized universities in India and has notified in the Gazette of India, Part 1, Section 1, dated 11, 2006. Since 1928 an associate membership to the IEI has been deemed equivalent (by the Association of Indian Universities and the Union Public Service Commission) to an undergraduate degree in Engineering. The Indian Ministry of Human Resource Development considers that this qualification is equivalent to a B.E. and B.Tech degree awarded by a recognized Indian university and to a British Bachelor's Honors degree. The Foreign Credential Service of America considers it to be equivalent to a bachelor's degree in engineering.

National recognitions
The government of India, in continuation to its earlier recognition, has recognized the passing of Section A & B Examinations as revised, conducted by The Institution of Engineers (India), as equivalent to a bachelor's degree in the appropriate branch of engineering of the recognized universities in India and has notified in the Gazette of India, Part1, Section1, dated 11,2006, Link=> https://www.ieindia.org/webui/IEI-Academics.aspx#iei_recognitions
 All Recognition Letters
 MHRD Recognition Letter
 UPSC Recognition Letter
 Government of India Recognition Letter
 AICTE Recognition Letter
 Recognized by GATE Exam
  I.I.T. Bombay Recognition Letter
 I.I.M Ahmedabad Recognition Letter
 Look all other Recognition Letters

International recognitions
The Institution of Engineers (India) [IEI] has bilateral relations with engineering professional institutions in 41 organizations around the world and is also the founding member of major international engineering organizations. This mutual relationship promotes the advancement of the engineering profession in general and recognition in particular amongst all the members attached to these professional societies. IEI plays the leading role in engineering activities across the world and provides an international platform to its members, Link=> 
https://www.ieindia.org/webui/IEI-Network.aspx#international-links.

Membership categories
Members are divided into two main types: corporate (organic) and non-corporate (nirangik). Members and associate members are calculated in advance. Respected members of type II members, brothers (companion), graduates, students, associate members and auxiliaries (subscriber) are counted. According to the official declaration of the first type member "chartered engineer" noun officer. All applicants are considered for general education, proper practical training, and personal integrity to take up the responsibilities of an engineer.

Designations of The Institution of Engineers of (India):
Fellow - F.I.E.
Member - M.I.E.
Associate member - A.M.I.E.
Chartered Engineer - C.Eng.
Professional Engineer - P.Eng.
International Professional Engineer - Int.PEng.
Senior Technician Member - ST
Technician Member - T
Institutional member
Donor Member
Arbitrator

Senior designations:-

Fellow (F.I.E.):- Fellowship (F.I.E.) is the most senior and most reputed engineering degree and grade of Corporate Membership awarded by The Institution of Engineers (India). Holders are entitled to use the post-nominals, F.I.E.. Professors / Assistant Professors / Associate Professors of I.I.T. / N.I.T. / Universities / Other Engineering Colleges in the scale of Pay Band–4, (i.e.-Rs.37400–67000) have eligibility to opt Fellowship (F.I.E.). Ph.D. passed in Engineering and Technology with 20 years Engineering Experience are also eligible to opt F.I.E. Engineering Degree. Look=> http://ieigsc.org/corporate-membership
Member (M.I.E.):- Membership is also a more senior and more reputed engineering degree and grade of Corporate Membership awarded by The Institution of Engineers (India). Holders are entitled to use the post-nominals, M.I.E. MTech. passed in Engineering and Technology with eight years engineering experience are eligible to opt M.I.E. Engineering Degree Certificate. Look=> http://ieigsc.org/corporate-membership
Associate Member (A.M.I.E.) Associate Membership is also a basic and reputed engineering degree and grade of Corporate Membership awarded by The Institution of Engineers (India). Holders are entitled to use the post-nominals, A.M.I.E. Section A & B Examinations passed in Engineering and Technology from the Institution of Engineers (India), 8 Gokhale Road, Kolkata with engagement in engineering and Technology organization are eligible to opt A.M.I.E. Engineering Degree Certificate. Associate Member of The Institution of Engineers(I) was earlier known and called as Grad.I.E. (Graduate of The Institution of Engineers India). Look=> http://ieigsc.org/corporate-membership

Examination
The IEI pioneered non-formal education in engineering. Since 1928, the AMIE examinations have been deemed by the Association of Indian Universities and the Union Public Service Commission to be equivalent to an undergraduate degree in engineering. The Indian Ministry of Education considers that this qualification is equivalent to a BE and BTech degree awarded by a recognized Indian university and to a British Bachelor's Honors degree. The Foreign Credential Service of America recognizes it as equivalent to a bachelor's degree in engineering.

The AMIE examination has two sections:  Section A is common to all candidates, while Section B is specific to a particular stream of engineering. To take the examinations, the candidate must have been a technician member of the IEI for a year. Examinations are held twice yearly.

Post-graduate (masters) programs in engineering and technology are offered to IEI corporate members in selected engineering disciplines.

Other activities
Other institutions represented: - A goal of this organization is that it is to cooperate with universities and other Shicshadikarion education of the engineers to trigger on. Universities and other Shicshasnsthaon committees, are also represented. The institution "Engineering Institutions Ov Ov Kanfrens the Commonwealth" is also associated with.
Annual session: - Each local center's annual session in the month of December. The main body of the annual session alternately in each center, at his invitation, in the month of January or February, in which all members are represented all over the country and important articles published in the Journal of the dispute. The architecture of the ancient institution Badarmay printed and handwritten texts and related literature collection Arwachin Nagpur is in the center.
Evaluation: - As per UPSC (Union Public Service Commission), the associate membership examination is a good engineering degree examination Recognized equivalent. Not only that, the university degrees and the organization of other Diploma for its associate membership to the Union Public Service Commission only recognizes the central government considers appropriate for engineering services. Most state governments and other public institutions are the same. The new degree or diploma to recognize the institution has kept stable following procedure. The first officer on behalf of the university or institution is applying for accreditation. Council appoints a committee which subsequently went on college course levels and its relevance, exams, teachers, and other features means checking your own report to the Council. Council then gives its decision on recognition.

See also
Engineering Council of India
Engineering education in India
Engineering Staff College of India
Regulation and licensure in engineering

References

External links
 Official Website

1920 establishments in British India
Educational boards based in Kolkata
Indian engineering organisations
Organisations based in Kolkata
Professional associations based in India
Organizations established in 1920